The 2009 Concurso Internacional de Tenis – Vigo was a professional tennis tournament played on outdoor red clay courts. It was part of the 2009 ATP Challenger Tour. It took place in Vigo, Spain between 10 and 16 August 2009.

Singles entrants

Seeds

 Rankings are as of August 3, 2009.

Other entrants
The following players received wildcards into the singles main draw:
  Ignacio Coll-Riudavets
  Gregg Hill
  Pablo Lijo Santos
  Anton Peskov

The following players received entry from the qualifying draw:
  Adam Chadaj
  Pedro Clar-Rosselló
  Albert Ramos-Viñolas
  Mathieu Rodrigues

Champions

Singles

 Thiemo de Bakker def.  Thierry Ascione, 6–4, 4–6, 6–2

Doubles

 Thiemo de Bakker /  Raemon Sluiter def.  Pedro Clar-Rosselló /  Albert Ramos-Viñolas, 7–5, 6–2

References
ITF search